Storekvina is a village in Kvinesdal municipality in Agder county, Norway. The village had a population of 323 in 2015.

The Sørlandet Line runs through the village, stopping at the Storekvina Station, the sole train station serving Kvinesdal municipality. There is also a primary school and a store in the village.

References

Villages in Agder
Kvinesdal